Calcium 2-aminoethylphosphate (Ca-AEP or Ca-2AEP) is a compound discovered by the biochemist Erwin Chargaff in 1941. It is the calcium salt of phosphorylethanolamine. It was patented by Hans Alfred Nieper and Franz Kohler.

Terminology and glossary
Calcium 2-amino ethyl phosphoric acid (Ca-AEP or Ca-2AEP) is also called calcium ethylamino-phosphate (calcium EAP), calcium colamine phosphate, calcium 2-aminoethyl ester of phosphoric acid, and calcium 2-amino ethanol phosphate

2-AEP plays a role as a component in the cell membrane and at the same time has the property to form complexes with minerals. This mineral transporter goes into the outer layer of the outer cell membrane where it releases its associated mineral and is itself metabolized with the structure of the cell membrane.

History, treatments, uses, and risks
Ca-AEP was discovered by Erwin Chargaff in 1953.  

According to the U.S. National Multiple Sclerosis Society Calcium EAP is often promoted as a cure or therapy for Multiple Sclerosis and many other diseases. However, it states that it is not recommended by its medical advisory board, and also notes that the Food and Drug Administration has classified it as unsafe and unapproved for use.

Calcium 2-AEP is  manufactured by numerous nutraceutical companies and is sold online and in health food stores.

References 

Calcium compounds
Organophosphates
Membrane biology
Multiple sclerosis